Robert Tweedie Middleton (5 December 1831 – 1891) was a Scottish Liberal politician who sat in the House of Commons from 1880 to 1885.

Middleton was the son of James Middleton of Glasgow and his wife Mary Tweedie, daughter of Robert Tweedie. He was a merchant in Glasgow and a J.P. for Lanarkshire and Dumbarton.

Middleton put himself forward as a parliamentary candidate at Glasgow in 1879 but withdrew to prevent a party division. At the 1880 general election he was elected Member of Parliament for Glasgow. He held the seat until 1885.

Middleton died at the age of 60 and is buried in Glasgow Necropolis.

Middleton married Rachel Milne Watson, daughter of Sir James Watson of Glasgow.

References

External links
 

1831 births
1891 deaths
Scottish merchants
Scottish Liberal Party MPs
Members of the Parliament of the United Kingdom for Glasgow constituencies
UK MPs 1880–1885
19th-century Scottish businesspeople